Heterosexuals Organized for a Moral Environment (HOME) is an American pro-heterosexuality, anti-homosexuality organization founded by Wayne Lela and based in Downers Grove, Illinois. The organization's aim is "to use science, logic, and natural law to expose all the flaws in the arguments homosexuals (and bisexuals) use to try to justify homosexual activity". The organization has been designated an anti-gay hate group by the Southern Poverty Law Center "based on their propagation of known falsehoods".

Background
HOME's main goal is to foster heterosexuality, oppose LGBT rights, and to criminalize homosexual relations. The group claims that if homosexuality remains legal, then "necrophilia and pedophilia may become legal activities".

According to their web site, the group supports the idea that "penalizing people for engaging in homosexual behavior is clearly not discrimination, just like penalizing people for exhibitionism or incest is not discrimination", adding that "heterosexual activity is not illegalizeable ... while homosexual activity is definitely illegalizeable".  HOME believes  that gays should apologize "for all the STDs (sexually transmitted diseases) they've spread, and all the money those STDs have cost." HOME also makes a connection between Freemasonry and homosexual sex, positing that Masons may be using their power and influence to spread homosexual values, and linking Masonic rites with homosexual sex.

History
Heterosexuals Organized for a Moral Environment (HOME) was founded in 1990 by Wayne Lela, a former Catholic and now self-described agnostic.

Activism
Several colleges have permitted HOME to set up a booth on the campus once each semester. The institutions in no way support or agree with the message delivered by this group. 

In 2005, Weissman Jordan of the Daily Northwestern wrote that HOME distributed flyers on the Northwestern University campus, and that most students accepted the fliers and threw them in a nearby trash can.

In 2006, Joliet Junior College required HOME's founder, Wayne Lela, to use a remote free speech zone. Lela commented that "you could be standing out there with all kinds of fliers and you're not going to see anybody unless they go significantly out of their way."

In 2007, students at the University of Chicago protested against Lela, who was distributing flyers denouncing homosexual behavior.

Hate group designation 
On November 22, 2010, the Southern Poverty Law Center (SPLC) designated the Heterosexuals Organized for a Moral Environment (HOME) as an anti-gay hate group "based on their propagation of known falsehoods". According to the SPLC, Heterosexuals Organized for a Moral Environment "is entirely focused on the alleged evils of homosexuality [and] attacks gay people on a wide variety of levels".

See also
 List of organizations designated by the Southern Poverty Law Center as anti-gay hate groups
 Parents Action League

References

External links
 Official page

Organizations in the ex-gay movement
Organizations based in Illinois
Organizations established in 1990
1990 establishments in the United States
Organizations that oppose LGBT rights in the United States
Anti-Masonry